Topsæ is a lake in the municipality of Bygland in Agder county, Norway. The Topsæfossen waterfall is located at the north end of the lake at the primary inflow. At the southeastern corner of the lake, there is a small dam to regulate the outflow of the lake into the Tovdalselva watershed.

See also
List of lakes in Aust-Agder
List of lakes in Norway

References

Lakes of Agder
Setesdal
Bygland